Sasha binti Mohd Saidin (born 20 December 1976) is a Malaysian singer and actress. She was formerly a member of the Malaysian pop group "Elite".

Early life

Sasha was born to an English mother, Siti Aisyah Abdullah and a Malaysian Malay father, Mohamad Saidin Osman. She has an older brother and a younger brother. She was educated at Bukit Bintang Girls' School. She graduated with a diploma in 2002 at KDU University College and a Bachelor of Business Information Systems from the University of East Anglia.

Career
Sasha started modelling at the age of seven after being spotted by a modelling agency in a shopping complex. By thirteen, she started to model for fashion shoots and later, at seventeen, catwalk shows. In 1996, Sasha attended an open audition at the KRU Records in 1996 and was selected as one of the members of "Elite".

Personal life
Sasha married to Jason Skinner (Johan Abdullah Skinner) in 2003. However, the couple divorced in 2007. She then married an Indonesian, Salyo Priyanto Notosoemarsono, giving birth to a son in 2010. The couple divorced in 2012.

In January 2020, Sasha married her school friend, Sirhan Wahab. The couple had known each other since secondary school. She plans to reside in the United Arab Emirates as her husband works in the financial sector there. Sirhan has two children from his previous marriage.

References

1976 births
Living people
Alumni of the University of East Anglia
Malaysian actresses
Malaysian television personalities
Malaysian people of English descent
Malaysian people of Malay descent
Malaysian Muslims